Frédéric Chopin's Berceuse, Op. 57, is a lullaby to be played on the piano. He composed it in 1843/44 as variations in D-flat major. Chopin originally called his work Variantes. Berceuse was first published in Paris in 1844 by Jean-Racine Meissonnier, dedicated to Élise Gavard, and appeared in London and Leipzig the following year.

Written late in his career, the lyrical piece features complex pianistic figuration in the continuous flow of variations on a calm bass in always soft dynamics, shaping the music by texture and sonority.

History 
Chopin began the composition in the summer of 1843 at Nohant, where he stayed with George Sand. As the first manuscript was held by the singer Pauline Viardot, the composition may have been inspired by her little daughter, Louisette, who also spent the summer there while her mother was away giving concerts. The theme of the Berceuse echos a song that Chopin may have heard in his childhood, "Już miesiąć zeszedł, psy się uśpily" (The moon now has risen, the dogs are asleep).

Chopin completed Berceuse in 1844, shortly before his Piano Sonata in B minor. It is a series of 16 variations on an ostinato ground bass. In an early sketch of the composition, the "variantes" were even assigned numbers. Chopin first began the work with the theme but wrote two measures of introduction later.

At first the composer titled the work Variantes, but the title was altered for publication to the current Berceuse, "berceuse" literally meaning "Cradle song". It was first published by Jean-Racine Meissonnier of Paris in 1844 and was dedicated to Élise Gavard (1824–1900), saying on the title page: "Berceuse / pour le piano / dédié à / Mademoiselle Élise Gavard / par / F. CHOPIN." The first publication in England was by Wessel & Co. in London on 22 June 1845, and the first publication in Germany was by Breitkopf & Härtel in Leipzig in July 1845.

Structure and music 

Chopin composed the work as a series of 16 short variations on an ostinato ground bass. He first began the work with the theme but wrote two measures of introduction later. The music begins and ends in 6/8 time. The variations of four measures are not divided by rests, but form a steady flow. Several variations show highly independent ornamental lines in complex rapid filigree, contrasting with the stable bass. The dynamics stay low throughout the piece. Sonority and texture shape the music, which the musicologist Jim Samson describes as a "sense of departure and return". He notes that Claude Debussy was interested in this aspect of Chopin's music. Only once, shortly before the end, does the bass change.

Zdzisław Jachimecki described the composition as follows: 

Jean-Jacques Eigeldinger sees the Berceuse as a "late lyrical piece", together with the Barcarolle, Op. 60, and the Nocturne, Op. 62, No. 1, all of them full of "pianistic figurations" reminiscent of his early "brilliant" style. Eigeldinger has suggested that Chopin's style in these pieces "approaches that of musical symbolism/impressionism".

Literature 
 Paul L. Mergier-Bourdeix (ed.), Jules Janin. 735 lettres à sa femme, Vol. 1, Paris: Klincksieck, 1973
 Krystyna Kobylańska, Frédéric Chopin. Thematisch-Bibliographisches Werkverzeichnis, Munich 1979, pp. 123–125

References

External links
 Autograph French National Library
 
 Analysis of Berceuse Op.57 at Chopin: the poet of the piano
 Thierry Vagne: Chopin Lullaby – Compared Listening vagnethierry.fr 10 January 2016

Compositions by Frédéric Chopin
Compositions for solo piano
1844 compositions
Compositions in D-flat major